Nicolas Zippelius (born 1 August 1987) is a German politician of the CDU who has been serving as a member of the Bundestag since 2021.

Early life and education
Zippelius was born in the West German city of Karlsruhe and studied political science in Hanover and Frankfurt.

Political career
Zippelius was elected directly to the Bundestag in 2021, representing the Karlsruhe-Land district. In parliament, he has since been serving on the Committee on Economic Cooperation and Development and the Committee on Digital Affairs.

References

Living people
1972 births
Politicians from Karlsruhe
German politicians
Members of the Bundestag 2021–2025
Members of the Bundestag for the Christian Democratic Union of Germany